Clarksburg is an unincorporated community in Clarksburg Township, Shelby County, Illinois, United States.

References

Unincorporated communities in Shelby County, Illinois
Unincorporated communities in Illinois